is a Japanese former professional baseball pitcher.

Kanemura pitched for the Hokkaido Nippon-Ham Fighters during Game 4 when they won the 2006 Japan Series against the Chunichi Dragons.

References

External links

1976 births
Hanshin Tigers players
Hokkaido Nippon-Ham Fighters players
Japanese baseball coaches
Japanese baseball players
Living people
Nippon Ham Fighters players
Nippon Professional Baseball pitchers
People from Kesennuma, Miyagi
Nippon Professional Baseball coaches